The 2015 Big 12 Conference football season is the 20th season of college football play for the Big 12 Conference.  It is part of the 2015 NCAA Division I FBS football season.

Preseason

Big 12 Media preseason poll

() first place votes

Preseason All-Big 12
2015 Pre-season Coaches All-Big 12

Offensive Player of the Year: Trevone Boykin, TCU, QB
Defensive Player of the Year: Shawn Oakman, Baylor, DE
Newcomer of the Year: Chris Carson, Oklahoma State, RB

Rankings

Regular season

Week One 

Players of the week:

Week Two

Players of the week:

Week Three

Players of the week:

Week Four

Players of the week:

Week Five

Players of the week:

Week Six

Players of the week:

Week Seven

Players of the week:

Week Eight

Week Nine

Week Ten

Week Eleven

Week Twelve

Week Thirteen

Week Fourteen

Bowl Games

References